Kompas TV is a national terrestrial private news television network in Indonesia. It is owned by the KG Media unit of Kompas Gramedia Group and is named after its flagship property, the Kompas daily newspaper. Kompas TV was founded in around 2008 and was launched on 9 September 2011 with Simfoni Semesta Raya's performance. Kompas TV's current slogan is "Independent, Reliable".

On 28 January 2016, Kompas TV was relaunched as a news-oriented network.

Networks 

Hours before the maiden broadcast, the Indonesian Broadcasting Commission issued a statement that Kompas TV did not have a broadcasting license. In response, Kompas TV announced that the channel was merely a content provider and was not required to have a broadcast license because its content could be aired on regional and international channels. Kompas TV started their broadcast through local television networks in some of the Indonesian provinces. The local television networks featured 70% local content and 30% Kompas TV programmes. The local TV stations that air the Kompas TV network are:

Other Indonesian cities are expected to follow later through the establishment of local stations that relay Kompas broadcasts. Since 9 September 2011, Kompas TV has been available through these pay television networks:
 First Media
 IndiHome
 Transvision
 Skynindo
 K-Vision
 MNC Vision

Kompas TV can also be viewed through satellite broadcast from Palapa-D satellite.

Kompas TV Digital 
PT Gramedia Nusantara proposed digital TV broadcasting, but the government has postponed approval pending completion of its National TV Digital Broadcasting Policy.

Presenters

Current
 Rahmat Ibrahim (former SCTV, TVB Semarang and Kompas TV Jawa Tengah reporter and anchor)
 Yasir Nene Ama (former MetroTV reporter)
 Timothy Marbun (former Indosiar anchor, also a talk show presenter)
 Yan Rahman
 Nina Melinda (former TV7 and MetroTV anchor)
 Nitia Anisa (also a talk show presenter)
 Mercy Tirayoh
 Woro Windrati (former Trans TV anchor)
 Liviana Cherlisa Latief (former MNCTV anchor)
 Frisca Clarissa (also a talk show presenter)
 Radi Saputro
 Adisty Larasati
 Audrey Chandra
 Pascalis Iswari (former MetroTV reporter, also an economy presenter)
 Cynthia Rompas (former GTV anchor)
 Hardjuno Pramundito
 Arizona Galih
 Glenys Octania (also an economy presenter)
 Ihsan Sitorus
 Ivo Nasution (former iNews anchor)
 Iryanda Mardanuz (also a talk show presenter)
 Muhammad Syahreza (former iNews anchor)
 Jihan Novita
 Valentina Sitorus
 Ni Luh Puspa
 Vidi Batlolone
 Gratia Adur
 Githa Maharkesri
 Tata Novasiliana
 Claudia Carla
 Edwin Zhan
 Imron Fadillah
 Fransisco Donasiano
 Elgeen Frydianto (also a sports anchor)
 Thifal Solesa
 Maydop Elfrina
 Mysister Tarigan
 Rosianna Silalahi (former SCTV anchor) (Rosi)
 Budiman Tanuredjo (senior journalist at Kompas) (Satu Meja The Forum)
 Bayu Sutiyono (former SCTV and SUN TV anchor)
 Cindy Sistyarani
 Faisal Al'Ansori
 Mila Dewi
 Maryo Sarong
 Putri Oktaviani
 Melisa Gandasari (Bincang Kita and Zona Inspirasi)
 Diana Dwika (Bincang Kita)
 Widi Dwinanda (Bincang Kita)
 Permata Sari Harahap (Bincang Kita)
 Dewi Kumala (Ngopi)
 Fatih Andhika (Ate) (Ngopi)
 Patra Gumala (Ngopi)

Former
 Azizah Hanum (now at SCTV)
 Bayu Andrianto (now at tvOne)
 Sakti Al Fattaah (retired)
 Amie Ardhini
 Kartika Octaviana
 Tascha Liudmila (now at BTV)
 Shafira Umm (now at SEA Today)
 Utrich Farzah (now at Indosiar)
 Mehulika Sitepu (retired)
 Achmad Topan (now at RTV)
 Daniar Achri (now at CNN Indonesia, Trans7 and Trans TV)
 Jessica
 Dian Ardianti
 Ratna Dumila
 Fiba Fitrisia
 Darius Sinathrya
 Raditya Dika
 Pandji Pragiwaksono
 Donna Agnesia
 Nadine Chandrawinata
 Duma Riris Silalahi
 Ramon Y Tungka
 Chevrina Anayang
 Indah Dian Novita
 Hamdan Alkafie (now at MetroTV)
 Danny Maulana (now at Indosiar)
 Akbari Madjid
 Anastasia Praditha (now at Trans7 on the program Selebrita)
 Teuku Parvinanda
 Dyan Nugraha
 Mutiara Tobing
 Meliza Gilbert (now at IndiHome TV)
 Gibran Muhammad
 Awis Mranani
 Bima Marzuki
 Feliciano Haryanto
 Conchita Caroline (now at MNCTV on the La Liga broadcast)
 Fajar Syahbana
 Icha Avrianty
 Riga Danniswara
 Maria Anneke (now at CNBC Indonesia)
 Sarah Ariantie (now at CNN Indonesia, Trans7 and Trans TV)
 Fristian Griec (now at BTV)
 Stefani Ginting (now at BTV)
 Adristya Chintya (retired)
 Riko Anggara (now at SCTV)
 Resky Wibowo (now at Radio Sonora)
 Nurul Fujairah (now at Radio Sonora)
 Reza Trinanda (now at Radio Gen FM)
 Muhammad Haikal (now at Motion Radio)
 Aji Pangestu (now at MetroTV)
 Glory Rosary Oyong (now at Kompas Gramedia)
 Astrid Wibisono
 Venny Simbolon
 Lintang Pudyastuti
 Sofie Syarief
 Aiman Witjaksono (now at MNC News, RCTI and iNews on the program The Prime Show)
 Yulika Satria Daya

Slogans 
 Inspirasi Indonesia (9 September 2011–28 January 2016)
 Berita dan Inspirasi Indonesia (28 January 2016–19 October 2017)
 Independen, Terpercaya (19 October 2017–present)

Anniversary Theme 
 9 Tahun Saling Percaya (2020, 9th Anniversary)
 10eKade Teman Terpercaya (2021, 10th Anniversary)
 11 Tahun Inspirasi Indonesia (2022, 11st Anniversary)

Gallery

See also

 List of television stations in Indonesia

References

External links 
 

 
Television channels and stations established in 2011
24-hour television news channels in Indonesia
2011 establishments in Indonesia
Television networks in Indonesia
Kompas Gramedia Group